Shaikhdara  or Shaikh Dara  is the most popular locality of Union Council Dubair Bala in Lower Kohistan District of  Khyber-Pakhtunkhwa province of Pakistan. Shaikh is Arabic for 'Islamic scholar' and Dara means valley so Shaikhdara means 'the valley of Islamic scholars'.

Sub localities
A list of sub localities is provided here:
Peeranokilay. 
Dabru. 
Ghain Bhoin.  
Kaarin. 
Bhoin. 
Gaidru. 
Baanw. 
Kothal. 
Takki.

Peeranokilay 

Peeranokilay is most populated area among other sub localities of Shaikhdara. It is the place where Great Islamic Scholars and Sufis (popular district wise) used to live. Some of them were great Hakims of their time and used to cure those patients who were turned down by other doctors. The main spiritual personality and Hakim was Syed Abdulhaq Sahib (the greater Babaji), people used to come to his Darbar from far away places like Gilgit, Hunza, Haripur and Mardan in those days and were never returned hopeless. The other popular personality was Molvi Jabal Qazi, a scholar. Due to his abilities King of Swat appointed him Zilla Qazi. He was so good at it that there was no dispute left unsolved after his death. He is son in law of the greater Babaji and father of today's scholar Mufti Sardaraz Faizy.

Peeranokilay is fairly developed as compared to other sub localities as it has a Primary School, a proposed Middle School, a dispensary, a Jami' Mosque Masjid-e-Noor Shaikhdara (which is also a Markaz for Dawat-e-Tabligh). Men are 100% while females are 25−30% literate. Females take education from their father, brother or their husbands.because there is no school for girls nearby.
Throughout Dubair this is only area where comparatively higher degree of literacy is found. Most of them are in Government service as teachers, Police force, Health and are serving their nation with pride.

Dabru
 
Dabru is Diminutive used for Dabr which means small plain field.

Small houses surrounded by large rocks and have small patches of fields in it is the picture of Dabru. It was once called Dabru because it was plain area later the rocks descended from mountains and stopped at this place. The place with highest elevation at Dabru is Makashtu which is around 1880 m high from sea level while the lowest level is around 1720 m high.
 
Though population is noteworthy but literacy level is poor. Health and poverty remains their big problem. People living here are mostly Baba khail and descendants of one of the five grand fathers of Baba khail. They are known as Dabru Waal.

Bhoin

Scanty houses in curved fields where each house is surrounded by one or more trees is what a person on first look can describe Bhoin. 
Bhoin in local tongue means small locality on top of a mountain. People of Bhoin are famous for their hospitality and poetry in local language. This also remains the fact that inhabitants of Bhoin have beautiful vocal cords in their neck they are very good at singing, reciting and saying Naats.

The worst face of Bhoin Waal lies in wood cutting. Their main job remains wood cutting and selling of logs which has destroyed forests to a large extent although trend is changing in new generations who are taking interest in other businesses.

Baanw

Have a look at Shaikhdara and a place with spade like presentation filled with lush green fields and a few houses surrounded by heavy jungle, this is Baanw. It has been used as a place of living for the last 500 years and still inhabitants live here from the month of May to September. 
To foreigners it is place of special interest due to its beauty. It also has a very ancient Mosque which was made up of at least 150 years old timber,  As this place is located at the height of around 7600 to 7800 feet from sea level and its location is placed really well because here you can see clear picture of Dubair darra (the area that lies between the mountains, see in the picture above). Tourists and photographer termed it Fairy land after seeing this view and one of them said Series of wavy mountains, serpentine flow of a stream, billowing flocks of cloud and a lush green valley instantly change into a "Fairyland" as soon as human soul be present there. It becomes a Real beauty from a Surreal beauty.(Kishore Kumar Biswas)

Population

As of April 2012 the population of Shaikhdara is estimated around 2,500 of which 40% share is from Peeranokilay.
The main tribes on Dubair side are Mulakhel, Soyakhel, Saadat, Gotharkhel, Shahbaazkhel, Shadumkhel, Tirrima, Paalaskhel (also known as Kakakhel (tribe) and Shaikhdarwal (Peeran).Further Shaikhdarwal tribe is divided into five casts Shareef zaadgan, Sadeeq zaadgan, Muhammad Mir zaadgan, Ghaus Mir zaadgan and Dabruwal. Paalaskhel are further divided into Ali Muhammad khel and Shekh Muhammad khel. The Shaikhdarawal and Paalaskhel live together in Shaikhdara since 3 generations.

The actual population is much more than the recorded but a big chunk of population has migrated from here due to one reason or other and are residing in Oghi, Mansehra, Abbottabad, Islamabad, Karachi, Torghar, Besham, Buner, and Swat. This is data of people residing in Shaikhdara some others also live in Pattan, Jijaal and Kandya Kohistan.

Population density is 650/km2 (1,700/sq mi)

Language
Language spoken here is primarily one of the Dardic language Indus Kohistani Maiya locally known as Abasin Kohistani or Kohiste while some researchers called it Maiyã (Mayon) or Shuthun but these names are not known locally. It is very similar to Torwali language that is spoken in Bahrain and Chail Swat.

Topography
As it is hilly area and surrounded by mountains with elevations and depressions at different places thus the highest elevation from sea level is about 2,800 m at "Zaid sar" a place in 'Takki' and lowest elevation 1480m at 'Kothal'. Total area occupied is 3.818 km2 (1.474 sq mi).
Elevation of different sub localities are as follows

References

External links
Local Website 
Local Images

Populated places in Lower Kohistan District
Valleys of Khyber Pakhtunkhwa